Mafunzo Football Club is a Tanzanian / Zanzibarian football club.

The team competes in the Zanzibar Premier League.

They competed in the CAF Champions League for the first time in 2010.

Achievements 
Zanzibar Premier League: 3
2009, 2011, 2015

Zanzibar FA Cup: 1
2005

Performance in CAF competitions 
CAF Champions League: 2 appearances
2010 – Preliminary Round
2012 – Preliminary Round
2016 – Preliminary Round

References 

Football clubs in Tanzania
Zanzibari football clubs